This Silver Wing Medal is a military decoration awarded by Armed Forces of the Philippines to Philippine and allied military personnel. The Silver Wing Medal is awarded in only one class, and may be awarded by the Chief of Staff of the Armed Forces of the Philippines; the Commanding General, PAR Area Command; and Major Service Commanders.  The award is given for "meritorious achievement while participating in aerial flight and a single act of merit or for participation in sustained operations activities against the enemy while in an aerial flight."

Appearance
The Silver Wing medal is made of silver colored metal.  The design consists of a pair of silver wings sweeping from the bottom of the medal, nearly to the top.  Between the tips of the two wings are three five-pointed stars in relief superimposed on two chevrons, one below the other.  Centered on the medal is a paratrooper helmet in relief placed above three arched bands at the base of the wings.

The ribbon is white with a red central stripe, edged in yellow, and blue edges on each side.

See also
Awards and decorations of the Armed Forces of the Philippines

References

Citations

Bibliography
 The AFP Adjutant General, AFP Awards and Decorations Handbook, 1995, 1997, OTAG.
Military awards and decorations of the Philippines